The Golden Gate of the Ecliptic is an asterism in the constellation Taurus that has been known for several thousand years. The constellation is built by the two eye-catching open star clusters of the Pleiades and the Hyades that form the two posts of a virtual gate at the two sides of the ecliptic line.

Since all planets as well as the moon and the sun always move very closely along the virtual circle of the ecliptic, all these seven orbiting bodies are regularly passing through the Golden Gate of the Ecliptic. Since the moon is the closest of these heavenly bodies to the earth and it is inclined strong enough against the ecliptic, in some occasions the moon can cover the stars of the open star clusters or even can pass outside of the gate.

History 

From 4000 to 1500 BC the equinox was within the constellation Taurus, and therefore, this constellation was attached great importance. The 4500 year old sky tablet of the neolithic Tal-Qadi Temple in Malta is thought to display the Golden Gate of the Ecliptic.

Sources 
 Michael A. Rappenglück: Palaeolithic Timekeepers Looking at the Golden Gate of the Ecliptic; The Lunar Cycle and the Pleiades in the Cave of La-Tête-du-lion (Ardèche, France) — 21,000 BP, in: Barbieri C., Rampazzi F. (editors): Earth-Moon Relationships, Springer, Dordrecht

External links 

 The Golden Gate of the Ecliptic. In Wikibook: The Tal-Qadi Sky Tablet

References 

Asterisms (astronomy)
Taurus (constellation)
Pleiades Open Cluster
Hyades (star cluster)